Elena Manuele is an Italian singer.

Born in 2002, Elena Manuele is originally from San Gregorio di Catania, where she lives with her family and where she currently attends the Linguistic Lyceum.

She became popular in Italy in 2018, thanks to the victory of the Sanremo Young festival. The young Sicilian triumphed after performing "The Sky In a Room" and "A Long Love Story", two works by singer-songwriter Gino Paoli.

References 

2002 births
Living people
21st-century Italian singers
21st-century Italian women singers
Musicians from Catania